The 36th Indian Brigade was an infantry brigade of the British Indian Army that saw active service with the Indian Army during the First World War.  It took part in the Mesopotamian campaign and later formed part of the North Persia Force.  It remained with the Force until withdrawn in June 1921.

History
Formation
The 36th Indian Brigade was formed in December 1915 in Mesopotamia.  It was heavily involved in the attempts to relieve the 6th (Poona) Division besieged in Kut, including the Attack on the Dujaila Redoubt (8 March 1916).
14th Indian Division
In May 1916, the brigade joined the newly formed 14th Indian Division and remained with it until June 1918.  It took part in a large number of small actions: the Advance to the Hai and Capture of the Khudaira Bend (14 December 1916 – 19 January 1917),  the Capture of the Hai Salient (25 January – 5 February 1917), the Capture of the Dahra Bend (9 – 16 February), the Capture of Sannaiyat (17 – 24 February), the Passage of the Tigris (23 – 24 February), the Second Action of Jabal Hamrin (16 – 20 October), and the Third Action of Jabal Hamrin (3 – 6 December 1917).
North Persia Force
In June 1918, the brigade joined the North Persia Force and remained with it until June 1921.  It was replaced in the 14th Indian Division by the 56th Indian Brigade.

Order of battle
The brigade had the following composition in the First World War:
 1/6th Battalion, Devonshire Regiment (joined from Lahore; to Corps Troops in October 1916)
 26th Punjabis (joined in February 1916 from Bannu Brigade; left in August 1918 to join Persian Lines of Communications)
 62nd Punjabis (joined in February 1916 from 9th (Sirhind) Brigade, 3rd (Lahore) Division; left in August 1918 to join Persian Lines of Communications)
 82nd Punjabis (joined in February 1916 from 2nd (Nowshera) Brigade, 1st (Peshawar) Division; transferred in August 1918 to 37th Indian Brigade)
 1/4th Battalion, Hampshire Regiment (joined in October 1916 from Corps Troops)
 1st Battalion, 2nd King Edward's Own Gurkha Rifles (The Sirmoor Rifles) (joined in August 1918 from 37th Indian Brigade)
 1st Battalion, 6th Gurkha Rifles (joined in August 1918 from Corps Troops)
 36th Sikhs (joined in August 1918 from Corps Troops)
 186th Machine Gun Company (joined in August 1916)
 36th Light Trench Mortar Battery ('K' Light Trench Mortar Battery joined 14th Division in September 1917 and assigned to the brigade in February 1918)

Commanders
The brigade had the following commanders:

See also

Notes

References

Bibliography

External links
 

Brigades of India in World War I
Military units and formations established in 1915
Military units and formations disestablished in 1921